St. John's City Council has been the governing body of the city of St. John's, Newfoundland and Labrador. Since 1888, St. John's city council has governed under the Colony of Newfoundland, the Dominion of Newfoundland and since 1949, Canada.

The city council currently comprises 11 members: the Mayor, the Deputy Mayor and nine councillors, five which represent wards throughout the city and four that are elected at large.

2021-2025 council

2017-2021 council

2013-2017 council

See also
2013 Newfoundland and Labrador municipal elections
2017 Newfoundland and Labrador municipal elections
2021 Newfoundland and Labrador municipal elections

References

External links
 Members of Council

Municipal councils in Newfoundland and Labrador
Municipal government of St. John's, Newfoundland and Labrador
1888 establishments in Newfoundland